¡... Y murió por nosotros! ("...He Died for Us!") is a 1951 Mexican film. It stars Carlos Orellana.

External links
 

1951 films
1950s Spanish-language films
Mexican fantasy drama films
1950s fantasy drama films
Mexican black-and-white films
1950s Mexican films